SP-214  is a state highway in the state of São Paulo in Brazil. It starts in southwest São Paulo in the Socorro municipality and ends at a roundabout in Embu-Guaçu. The highway spans about 22 kilometers or 13.6 miles.

References

Highways in São Paulo (state)